The geography of Saskatchewan is unique among the provinces and territories of Canada in some respects. It is one of only two landlocked regions (Alberta is the other) and it is the only region whose borders are not based on natural features like lakes, rivers, or drainage divides. The borders of Saskatchewan, which make it very nearly a trapezoid, were determined in 1905 when it became a Canadian province.

The province's name comes from the Saskatchewan River, whose Cree name is: kisiskatchewani sipi, meaning "swift flowing river".

Saskatchewan can be divided into three regions: grassland (part of the Great Plains) in the south, aspen parkland in the centre, and forest in the north. The forest region lies partly on the northern part of the Great Plains and partly on the Canadian Shield. Its principal rivers are the Assiniboine River, and North and South Saskatchewan Rivers.

 Saskatchewan is bordered on the west by Alberta, on the north by the Northwest Territories, on the east by Manitoba, and on the south by the U.S. states of Montana and North Dakota.

Physical geography
Saskatchewan is very close to a trapezoid. Its western border runs concurrent with the 4th meridian or the 110°W longitude, separating Saskatchewan from the province of Alberta.

Saskatchewan's eastern border includes minor measurement errors from the 1880s, so that it does not lie perfectly on the 102°W longitude, but rather it is slightly west of that meridian from 60°N parallel to 55°47'N, then slightly east of that until the Canada–United States border – an irregular line (rather than a straight one) for its  distance. When Saskatchewan was formed in 1905, Manitoba and the District of Keewatin were the neighbouring areas to the east. Manitoba was enlarged in 1912 north to the 60th parallel, becoming Saskatchewan's only eastern neighbour. This remaining section of the border was determined by survey between 1961 and 1972.

Saskatchewan's southern border with the United States sits approximately on the 49th parallel, as agreed in the Treaty of 1818—though minor measurement errors during the 1870s International Boundary Survey result in some variance between the actual Canada–United States border and the 49th parallel. This boundary was not formally established until the 1867 survey.

The Northwest Territories is north of the 60th parallel which forms the northern border of the province.

Geology

The geology of Saskatchewan can be divided into two main geological regions, the Pre-Cambrian or Canadian shield and the Phanerozoic or Western Canada Sedimentary Basin. Within the Canadian shield exists the Athabasca sedimentary basin. Meteorite impacts have altered the natural geological formation processes. The Quaternary period is the most recent geological process when the prairies were affected by glacial events. There are six notable meteorite or comet impact craters in Saskatchewan. Carswell, Deep Bay and Gow Lake have affected the Canadian Shield area of the north. In the southern Phanerozoic crater are the Viewfield, Elbow and Maple Creek structures.

Historical geography

Archaeologists have dated the first human settlements to 9,500 BC. The four groups inhabiting the area at the time of the first European contact were the Cree, Assiniboine, Salteaux, and Dene. Henry Kelsey of the Hudson's Bay Company is considered the first European person to see this area. The earliest trading posts were made by the French; however, the first permanent settlement was established at Cumberland House in 1774 by the HBC. In addition, several more ports were set up by British fur traders among the area's waterways. The forested area of the Canadian Shield was the favoured area for early settlement, and the economy was heavily dependent on hunting and trapping.

In 1870, the Hudson's Bay Company sold Rupert's Land and ceded its rights to the Canadian Government. The region became a part of the North-West Territories. The majority of the Indigenous inhabitants in the North-West Territories made treaties with the British Crown (via Canadian government representatives) in the 1870s and were settled on Indian reserves. Additional native peoples and Métis, led by Louis Riel, rebelled between 1884 and 1885 in the North-West Rebellion and were suppressed.

The arrival of settlements and the rail lines also brought agricultural economies and development in the Central Lowlands Area. The Great Plains or Palliser Triangle area to the south was mainly used for ranching economies. In the beginning of the 20th century, Saskatchewan farmers created cooperative organizations to maintain grain marketization. During the drought and the  Great Depression of the 1930s, the population decreased as immigration nearly ended and numerous families left. During World War II, conservation programs and the increased demand for grain revived the economy.

Climate

Being in the centre of North America, Saskatchewan is far removed from the moderating effects of any large body of water and therefore has a temperate continental climate, Köppen climate classification types BSk, Dfb and Dfc. Hot to warm summers and cold winters mean that the annual temperature range can be up to 65 °C. On average, Saskatchewan has 211 days per year when the temperature drops below freezing. Plough winds, Supercell hail or high precipitation rain storms, and tornadoes are eventful summer occurrences. Midale reached 45 °C (113 °F) on July 5, 1937, one of the highest recorded temperatures in Canada.

Compared to average values from all thirteen Canadian provinces and territories, Saskatchewan is the sunniest province or territory year round (2206 hours per year), has the second-lowest annual snowfall, the fourth-lowest total precipitation and the second-hottest summer. The number of frost-free days ranges from 95 days in the north (Prince Albert, for example) to as high as 124 days in the south (Estevan).

Climate data

Climate change

The effects of climate change in Saskatchewan are now being observed in parts of the province. There is evidence of reduction of biomass in Saskatchewan's boreal forests (as with those of other Canadian prairie provinces) is linked by researchers to drought-related water stress, stemming from global warming, most likely caused by greenhouse gas emissions. While studies, as early as 1988 (Williams, et al., 1988) have shown climate change will affect agriculture, whether the effects can be mitigated through adaptations of cultivars, or crops, is less clear. Resiliency of ecosystems may decline with large changes in temperature. The provincial government has responded to the threat of climate change by introducing a plan to reduce carbon emissions, "The Saskatchewan Energy and Climate Change Plan", in June 2007.

Urban areas

Saskatchewan's capital and second largest city is Regina. Its most populous city is Saskatoon.

"Urban Areas", as defined by Statistics Canada, are areas of continuous population density, ignoring municipal borders.

Biosphere

Flora

The native flora of the Saskatchewan includes vascular plants, plus additional species of other plants and plant-like organisms such as algae, lichens and other fungi, and mosses. Non-native species of plants are recorded as established outside of cultivation in Saskatchewan, of these some non-native species remain beneficial for gardening, and agriculture, where others have become invasive, noxious weeds. Saskatchewan is committed to protecting species at risk in Canada. The growing season has been studied and classified into plant hardiness zones depending on length of growing season and climatic conditions. Biogeographic factors have also been divided into ecoregions and floristic kingdoms across Saskatchewan, and natural vegetation varies depending on elevation, moisture, soil and weather. The study of ethnobotany uncovers the interrelation between humans and plants and the various ways people have used plants for economic reasons, food, medicine and technological developments.

The Government of Saskatchewan has declared three indigenous plants as provincial symbols.

Fauna

The fauna of Saskatchewan include many land and aquatic species. From the multiplicity of invertebrates and vertebrates two have been chosen as symbols of Saskatchewan, the white-tailed deer and the sharp-tailed grouse. Cenozoic vertebrate fossils reveal the geological evolution of the interior plains and its prehistoric biogeography. Today, Saskatchewan's ecosystems range from the sub-arctic tundra of the Canadian Shield in north Saskatchewan to aspen parkland, and grassland prairie. Fauna inhabit areas unique to their own specific and varied breeding, foraging and nesting requirements. With a large land and water area, and small population density, the ecoregions of Saskatchewan provide important habitat for many animals, both endangered and not.

Naturalists observing wildlife have enumerated shrinking and growing wildlife populations. They advocate programs and methods to preserve or re-introduce endangered species and identify programs of control for outbreaks of wildlife populations.

A broad diversity of wildlife habitats are preserved as parks and reserves protecting the feeding and breeding grounds of protected and indigenous fauna of Saskatchewan.

Hydrography

The total area of freshwater is 59,366 km2. There are two main river basins, the Nelson and Churchill River Basins, both of which drain into Hudson Bay.

Qu'Appelle and Souris, the North and South Saskatchewan, confluence is east of Prince Albert becoming the Saskatchewan which are all a part of the Nelson river basin. The Churchill River connects lakes and streams through the lower portion of the Canadian Shield. Rupert's Land a historical political division of Canada comprised all lands of the Hudson Bay drainage system between the years 1670 to 1870.

Frenchman River does not flow east to Hudson Bay, but rather south to the Missouri River, which is part of the Missouri river basin catchment area. The Mackenzie River basin of north Saskatchewan flows north draining into the Arctic Ocean, which belongs to the Mackenzie river basin drainage area.

There are over 10,000 lakes across Saskatchewan, the main lake region being north of the tree line in the Canadian Shield.

Saskatchewan's largest lake is Lake Athabasca which sits astride the Saskatchewan – Alberta border. The second in size is Reindeer Lake which is located on the Saskatchewan – Manitoba border. Other lakes of notable size would be Wollaston, Cree, Frobisher, and Lac La Ronge. The deepest water point  is located in Reindeer Lake at the Deep Bay Structure site which was created by a meteor impact.

Saskatchewan is also home to preserved wetlands which are partially submerged areas of land.

Saskatchewan's waterways also contain bogs, as well as the salt water lakes. Quill Lake is Canada's largest saltwater lake, Chaplin Lake is a Western Hemispheric Shorebird Reserve Network and Little Manitou, an endorheic lake, is a popular tourist resort. Brine shrimp fisheries have existed on sodium magnesium sulphate lakes such as Chaplin, Frederick, Ingebright, and Little Manitou lakes.

Provincial and national parks

Saskatchewan has 36 provincial parks that provide for recreational use or preserve wilderness, special environments, or sites of historic importance.

The province is also home to two of Canada's 36 National Parks. The other is Prince Albert National Park covering  in central Saskatchewan, which was established in 1927.

Economic geography

The economy of Saskatchewan has been associated with agriculture resulting in the moniker Bread Basket of Canada and Bread Basket of the World. According to the Government of Saskatchewan, approximately 95% of all items produced in Saskatchewan, depend on the basic resources available within the province. Various grains, livestock, oil and gas, potash, uranium, wood and their spin off industries fuel the economy.

Saskatchewan's GDP in 2006 was approximately C$45.922 billion.

Gallery

See also 

 The Saskatchewan Act
 Geography of Canada

References

Further reading

External links

 An outline map showing the boundaries and major lakes and rivers for Saskatchewan. Includes names for major political and geographical features.